Aneta Florczyk (pseudonym Atena; born 26 February 1982) is a Polish female athlete and strongwoman.

Born in Malbork, Florczyk started her career at the age of 16, as a powerlifter. She won Polish Championships several times, and in 2000 became European Champion. As a first Polish athlete, she has broken the barrier of 500 kg in powerlifting. After she had been suspended in national team (the suspension has later been proven unfounded and overruled by the court), she began training weightlifting, becoming Polish Champion in juniors and vice Champion in seniors.

Since 2002, she has started training on the equipment typical for strongman and strongwoman contests. Only a year later, she won the World's Strongest Woman in Zambia and in 2004 the Europe's Strongest Woman in Ireland.

Later, she was World's Champion / World's Strongest Woman in 2003, 2005, 2006 and 2008. This means that she has won the competition more than any other woman in history, according to Guinness World Records.

Powerlifting and bench press achievements 

19 years old Juniors' Champion of Poland in bench press
23 years old Juniors' Champion of Poland in bench press
Silver medal in Seniors' Polish Championship in bench press
Silver medal on Polish Cup in bench press
Gold medal on Polish Cup in powerlifting
Seniors' Champion of Poland in powerlifting
Sport class – champion' s international
Member of National Team in bench press and powerlifting 1999–2001
Powerlifting – second place in European Championship of seniors, Luxembourg 2000
Record holder of Poland in powerlifting, weight category – 82,5 kg
Juniors' Record holder of Europe in deadlift – 213 kg
Silver medal in International Armwrestling Tournament
As a first Polish woman she broke the barrier of 500 kg in powerlifting (507,5)
As a first Polish woman she broke the barrier of 200 kg in deadlift

Weightlifting achievements 
2002 – Polish Vice Champion in seniors
2002 – Polish Champion in juniors
2002 – European Championship finalist in juniors

Strongwoman achievements 

2003 – Second place on Scandinavian Championship in Vasteras, Sweden
2003 – First place on Built Solid Strongman Challenge in Columbus, USA
2003 –  Fourth place on European Strongest Woman in Ireland
2003 – First place on World' s Strongest Woman in Zambia
2004 – First place on European Strongest Woman in Northern Ireland
2005 – First place on FitExpo in London
2005 – First place on International Norway's Championship in Larvik
2005 – First place on World's Strongwoman Championship in Northern Ireland
2005 – Second place on World's Highland Games Cup in Scotland
2005 – First place on Bregstaed contest, Norway
2005 – First place on Europe's Strongwoman Championship in Bydgoszcz
2006 – First place on World's Strongwoman Championship in Opalenica
2006 – First place, with Tyberiusz Kowalczyk, on international Strongman/Strongwoman Pairs Competition
2007 – Winning the European Strongwoman Championship – Trondheim, Norway
2008 – Winning the World Strongwoman Championship – Poland, Tczew

Dancing on Ice 
She appeared in the second edition of the Polish version of "Dancing on Ice" show (called "Gwiazdy tańczą na lodzie" in Poland). Her first partner was Marcin Czajka, but after two episodes he was replaced by Maciej Lewandowski. They finished the show at the 3rd place.

The frying pan stunt and Guinness World Records 
A major boost for her career came when a video clip was posted on the Internet, where Aneta was rolling a frying pan. The movie was unexpectedly popular and it got a lot of media interest. One of the results was the invitation (February 2008) for the Spanish edition of the show, where interesting tries of breaking the Guinness World Records are shown. Aneta had to roll most pans in one minute. She established the record rolling 4 pans.

In November 2008 she has improved her Record – rolling 5 pans. This time it was a part of the Chinese show, shot in Beijing.

Another record has been established once again in Spain, but this time it was about lifting adult men overhead. Aneta's result was 12, while her Spanish rival – athlete Irene Gutierrez – lifted 10 people.

References 

General sources
 Guinness Book of Records 2009
 http://www.heavysports.com/emag/aneta.html

External links 

 

Polish strength athletes
1982 births
Sports world record holders
Female powerlifters
Living people
People from Malbork
Sportspeople from Pomeranian Voivodeship
Strongwomen